Denis William Flanagan (July 22, 1930 – November 25, 2018) was a Canadian ice hockey player with the Lethbridge Maple Leafs. He won a gold medal at the 1951 World Ice Hockey Championships in Paris, France. The 1951 Lethbridge Maple Leafs team was inducted to the Alberta Sports Hall of Fame in 1974. He also played with the Stratford Kroehlers and Stratford Indians.

References

1930 births
2018 deaths
Canadian ice hockey centres
Ice hockey people from Ontario
Sportspeople from Kitchener, Ontario
Stratford Kroehlers players